The Guitar Album is a 1974 double compilation album featuring live performances of popular guitarists. It features eighteen tracks from artists Eric Clapton, Roy Buchanan, Rory Gallagher, T-Bone Walker, Ellen McIlwaine, Link Wray, Stone the Crows, John McLaughlin and Area Code 615. The album was issued by Polydor in a gatefold pressing. Though it was originally released in the United States it was later reissued in the United Kingdom.

Track listing

Side one
"Slunky" by Eric Clapton (B. Bramlett/E. Clapton) – 3:34
"Sweet Dreams" by Roy Buchanan (D. Gibson) – 3:33
"Walk on Hot Coals" by Rory Gallagher (R. Gallagher) – 7:01
"Everyday I Have the Blues" by T-Bone Walker (P. Chatman) – 2:47
"Sliding" by Ellen McIlwaine (E. McIlwaine) – 2:52

Side two
"Lawdy Miss Clawdy" by Link Wray (L. Price) – 2:40
"Tribute to Elmore James" by Roy Buchanan (R. Buchanan) – 3:25
"Have You Ever Loved a Woman" by Eric Clapton (B. Myles) – 6:54
"Tattoo'd Lady" by Rory Gallagher (R. Gallagher) – 4:40

Side three
"We the People" by Ellen McIlwaine (E. McIlwaine) – 3:21
"I May Be Right I May Be Wrong" by Stone the Crows (Stone the Crows) – 5:02
"After Hours" by Roy Buchanan (A. Parrish) – 6:13
"Let it Rain" by Eric Clapton (B. Bramlett/E. Clapton) – 5:03

Side four
"Extrapolation" by John McLaughlin (J. McLaughlin) – 3:54
"The Messiah Will Come Again" by Roy Buchanan (R. Buchanan) – 5:53
"Sligo" by Area Code 615 (Buttrey/Moss) – 2:23
"Losing You" by Ellen McIlwaine (E. McIlwaine) – 2:20
"Filthy Teddy" by Roy Buchanan (R. Buchanan) – 3:11

References                 

1974 compilation albums
Rock compilation albums
Polydor Records compilation albums